Khē is a letter of Arabic script, used to write  in Sindhi.

This is similar to the history of I and J, and of U and V, in the Latin alphabet.

Arabic letters
Sindhi language

This glyph may not be rendered or displayed as ک in Apple users’ devices. That is because Apple is using various fonts to render Arabic text. It will also not be rendered if there are languages displayed as Nasta’liq in the Language list in Apple devices.